The LAROM is a Romanian native-made, highly mobile, multiple rocket launcher, attached to a DAC-25.360 6x6 truck, in service with the Romanian Land Forces, built in collaboration with Israel. Currently there are 54 systems in service, all operated by the 8th Mixed Artillery Brigade. Most likely it was influenced by the BM-21 Grad 122 mm multiple rocket launcher (MRL) system which entered service with the Soviet Army in 1963 also utilizing a six-by-six truck chassis fitted with a bank of 40 122mm launch tubes arranged in a rectangular shape that can be turned away from the unprotected cabin.

Armament
The LAROM standard launch pod containers hold 13 LAR Mk IV rockets or 20 GRAD rockets, with two pods on a launcher.

The LAROM can operate with the standard 122 mm rockets, as well as with the more advanced 160 mm rocket, with a strike range between 20 and 45 km. The GRAD 122 mm rocket is utilised to suppress and annihilate concentrated targets. It has an 18 kg high-explosive warhead, a range of approximately 20 km and can be fired in salvos of up to 2 rounds per second.

The LAR-160 160mm rockets employ composite solid propellants. The rocket is spin-stabilizing  in flight via wraparound stabilizing fins deployed upon rocket exiting launcher. The Mk IV rocket is capable of taking various warheads and commonly fitted with either a HE-COFRAM type or a Cluster munition warhead. The cluster warhead operates by a remotely set electronic time-fuse which opens the bomblet canister at the calculated height to give area coverage of about 31,400 m2 for each cluster warhead. The LAR Mk IV has a minimum range of 10 km and maximum range of 45 km and can be fired in salvos of up to 1 round every 1.8 seconds.

Gallery

See also
LAR-160
BM-21;
RM-70;
M-77 Oganj;
T-122

External links
LAROM's description on Romanian Ministry of Defense official website

Rocket artillery
Artillery of Romania
Multiple rocket launchers